Cho Yong-seong (born January 25, 1986) is a South Korean sport shooter. At the 2012 Summer Olympics he competed in the Men's skeet, finishing in 35th place.

References

South Korean male sport shooters
Living people
Olympic shooters of South Korea
Shooters at the 2012 Summer Olympics
Shooters at the 2006 Asian Games
Shooters at the 2010 Asian Games
1986 births
People from Gimhae
Asian Games competitors for South Korea
Sportspeople from South Gyeongsang Province
20th-century South Korean people
21st-century South Korean people